Lectures on the History of Philosophy (LHP; , VGPh,)  delivered by Georg Wilhelm Friedrich Hegel 1805-6, 1816-8, 1819, 1820, 1825–6, 1827–8, 1829–30, and 1831, just before he died in November of that year.

Overview
Hegel's lecture notes were edited by his student, Karl Ludwig Michelet in 1833, and revised in 1840-2. An English translation was provided by Elizabeth Haldane in 1892.

In it, he outlined his ideas on the major philosophers. He saw consciousness as progressing from an undifferentiated pantheism of the East to a more individualistic understanding culminating in the freedom of the Germanic era.

In his lectures Hegel cites extensively the voluminous histories of philosophy written in Germany after 1740; among them: Johann Jakob Brucker's Historia critica philosophiae, 6 vols. (1742–67; "Critical History of Philosophy"); Johann Buhle's Lehrbuch der Geschichte der Philosophie, 8 vols. (1796–1804; "Textbook on the History of Philosophy"); Dietrich Tiedemann's Geist der spekulativen Philosophie von Thales bis Berkeley, 6 vols. (1791–97; "The Spirit of Speculative Philosophy from Thales to Berkeley"); and Wilhelm Gottlieb Tennemann's Geschichte der Philosophie, 11 vols. (1789–1819; "History of Philosophy").

See also 
 A History of Western Philosophy by Bertrand Russell
 A History of Philosophy by Frederick Copleston
 A New History of Western Philosophy by Anthony Kenny

References

Bibliography 

  (full text at Internet Archive Vol. 1) Vol. 2 Vol. 3

External links 
 Lectures on the History of Philosophy at archive.org
 Lectures on the History of Philosophy at marxists.org
 Blackwell Reference
 German text

Works by Georg Wilhelm Friedrich Hegel
History books about philosophy
Books of lectures